State Line Tack, a division of TABcom, LLC, is an equine products and supplies retailer. Beginning as a single outlet in Plaistow, New Hampshire in 1980, on the state line between New Hampshire and Massachusetts, State Line Tack converted an old barn into a two-story retail tack store. At that time, it offered the largest selection of horse supplies in a single location nationwide, and offered more reasonably priced lines of inventory than most of its competitors. It grew into a direct mail catalog retailer within a few years after being purchased by mail order pet supply giant Sporting Dog Specialties. In 1996, PetSmart, Inc. acquired Sporting Dog Specialties and its subsidiary State Line Tack for $45 million mostly paid in company stock, and opened more than 160 full-size (about 3,000 square feet) equine departments inside PetSmart stores.

In 2007, PetSmart sold State Line Tack, including the brand name, inventory, customer lists, and other assets, to Pets United (now known as TABCom, LLC) for an undisclosed amount. PetSmart closed all stores and the Fulfillment Center in Brockport, New York.  Under TABcom, State Line Tack continues to operate as an online retailer.

References

External links 
 Official site

Companies based in Rockingham County, New Hampshire